The WCWA Light Heavyweight Championship was a professional wrestling championship promoted by the Dallas–Fort Worth metroplex area-based World Class Wrestling Association (WCWA) promotion from September 13, 1987 until May 1989. The championship was for wrestlers under  pounds, the maximum limit of the "Light Heavyweight" division at the time. As it is a professional wrestling championship, it is won not by actual competition, but by a scripted ending to a match.

According to WCWA, inaugural champion Eric Embry won the championship by defeating Peter Vander Graling (or "Vandergraling") on a show in South Africa on September 13, 1987, however no sources have confirmed the validity of the claim, leading to the belief that this was simply a storyline by WCWA to explain how Embry became champion. Embry won WCWA Texas Heavyweight Championship on April 7, 1989, followed by the WCWA World Light Heavyweight Championship being declared vacant in May, after which it was never promoted again. Embry holds the record for most championship reigns, with five in total, the longest individual reign (295 days) and the longest combined reigns (approximately 518 days). Cactus Jack's five day reign, from December 30, 1988 to January 4, 1989, is the shortest reign of any champion.

Title history

Reigns by combined length
Key

Footnotes

References

World Class Championship Wrestling championships
Light heavyweight wrestling championships